Godo Holo (also Godo Olo) is a group of villages in the Tapanahony resort of the Sipaliwini District of Suriname. The villages are inhabited by Maroons of the Ndyuka people.

Godo Olo is the name for a group of three neighbouring villages: Saniki (also Sannetje), Fisiti (also Affivisti) and Pikienkondre of Miranda (Miranda's little village).

Godo Holo has a school and two churches, Medical care is provided in Diitabiki which is about 10 kilometres North East of Godo Holo. Godo Holo has regular fights to Paramaribo from the Godo Holo Airstrip which is located in Pikinkondre of Miranda. In November 2019, it was announced that the villages will get 24 hours of electricity via solar panels.

References

Bibliography

External links

Ndyuka settlements
Populated places in Sipaliwini District